The 2008 Giro di Lombardia was the 102nd edition of this single-day road bicycle racing monument race. The event took place on 18 October 2008, with Damiano Cunego winning it, his fourth victory of the year, and the third of his career in the Giro di Lombardia and his second consecutive victory. Cunego managed to break away from the peloton with 15 kilometres on the descent of the Civiglio and was able to resist the chase of the peloton to win alone on the waterfront of Como. Janez Brajkovič of Astana finished 24 seconds behind, followed by Rigoberto Urán of Caisse d'Epargne.

General standings
18 October 2008, 242 km

See also
2008 in Road Cycling

References

Giro di Lombardia
Giro di Lombardia
Giro di Lombardia